is a station on the Hankyu Kyoto Line.

Layout
The station has an island platform serving two tracks.

Shijō Station on the Karasuma Line subway is connected with Karasuma Station by a short underground walkway.

Usage
In fiscal 2015 (April 2015 to March 2016), about 33,933,000 passengers used this station annually. For historical data, see the table below.

History 
Karasuma Station opened on 17 June 1963.

Station numbering was introduced to all Hankyu stations on 21 December 2013 with this station being designated as station number HK-85.

Adjacent stations

References

External links
Karasuma Station from Hankyu Railway website

Railway stations in Japan opened in 1963
Hankyu Kyoto Main Line
Railway stations in Kyoto